The watermelon stereotype is an anti-black racist trope originating in the Southern United States. It first arose as a backlash against African-American emancipation and economic sufficiency in the late 1860s.  

After the American Civil War, in several areas of the south, former-slaves grew watermelon on their own land as a cash-crop to sell. Thus, for African-Americans, watermelons were a symbol of liberation and self-reliance, while for many in the majority white culture they embodied a loss, and threatened loss, of dominance. Southern-white resentment against African Americans led to a politically potent cultural caricature, using the watermelon to disparage African Americans as sloppy, childish, lazy, and publicly embarrassing.

History

The first published caricature of Black people reveling in watermelon is believed to have appeared in Frank Leslie's Illustrated Newspaper in 1869. The stereotype emerged shortly after enslaved people were emancipated after the Civil War. Defenders of slavery used it to portray African Americans as a simple-minded people who were happy when provided with watermelon and a little rest. The slaves' enjoyment of watermelon was also seen by the Southern people as a sign of their own supposed benevolence. The stereotype was perpetuated in minstrel shows often depicting African Americans as ignorant and lazy, given to song and dance and inordinately fond of watermelon.

For several decades in the late nineteenth century through to the mid-twentieth century, the stereotype was promoted through caricatures in print, film, sculpture and music, and was a common decorative theme on household goods.  During the 2008 Obama presidential campaign and the presidency of Barack Obama, watermelon imagery was used by his detractors.

In popular culture

The link between African-Americans and watermelons may have been promoted in part by African-American minstrels who sang popular songs such as "The Watermelon Song" and "Oh, Dat Watermelon" in their shows, and which were set down in print in the 1870s. The 1893 World's Columbian Exposition held in Chicago planned to include a "Colored People's Day" featuring African American entertainers and free watermelons for the African-American visitors whom the exposition's organizers hoped to attract. It was a flop, as the city's African-American community boycotted the exposition, along with many of the performers booked to attend on Colored People's Day.

At the end of the 19th century, there was a brief genre of "watermelon pictures" – cinematic caricatures of African-American life showing such supposedly typical pursuits as eating watermelons, cakewalking and stealing chickens, with titles such as The Watermelon Contest (1896), Dancing Darkies (1896), Watermelon Feast (1896),  and Who Said Watermelon? (1900, 1902). The African-American characters in such features were initially played by Black performers, but from about 1903 onwards, they were replaced by white actors performing in blackface.

Several of the films depicted African-Americans as having a virtually uncontrollable appetite for watermelons; for instance, The Watermelon Contest and Watermelon Feast include scenes of African-American men consuming the fruits at such a speed that they spew out mush and seeds. The author Novotny Lawrence suggests that such scenes had a subtext of representing Black male sexuality, in which Black men "love and desire the fruit in the same manner that they love sex … In short, black males have a watermelon 'appetite' and are always trying to see 'who can eat the most' with the strength of this 'appetite' depicted by black males uncontrollably devouring watermelon."

Early-1900s postcards often depicted African-Americans as animalistic creatures "happy to do nothing but eat watermelon" – a bid to dehumanize them. Other such "Coon cards", as they were popularly known, depicted African-Americans stealing, fighting over, and becoming watermelons. One poem from the early 1900s (pictured right) reads:

In March 1916, Harry C. Browne recorded a song titled "Nigger Love a Watermelon Ha!, Ha! Ha!", set to the tune of the popular folk song "Turkey in the Straw". Such songs were popular during that period and many made use of the watermelon stereotype. The script for Gone with the Wind (1939) contained a scene in which Scarlett O'Hara's slave Prissy, played by Butterfly McQueen, eats watermelon, which the actress refused to perform.  Use of this stereotype started to die down around the 1950s, and had mostly vanished by 1970, although its continued power as a stereotype could still be recognized in films such as Watermelon Man (1970), The Watermelon Woman (1996), and Bamboozled (2001). Watermelons also provided a theme for many racial jokes in the 2000s.

Protesters against African-Americans frequently hold up watermelons, among other things; imagery of Barack Obama consuming watermelon was subject of viral emails circulated by political opponents. After his election to the US presidency, watermelon-themed imagery of Obama continued to be created and endorsed. In February 2009, Los Alamitos Mayor Dean Grose resigned (albeit temporarily) after forwarding to the White House an email displaying a picture of the White House lawn planted with watermelons. Grose said that he was not aware of the watermelon stereotype. Other controversies included a statue of Obama holding a watermelon in Kentucky in 2012 and a 2014 editorial cartoon in the Boston Herald asking if Obama has tried watermelon-flavored toothpaste.

At the National Book Awards ceremony in November 2014, author Daniel Handler made a controversial remark after author Jacqueline Woodson was presented with an award for young people's literature. Woodson, who is Black, won the award for Brown Girl Dreaming. During the ceremony, Handler noted that Woodson is allergic to watermelon, a reference to the racist stereotype. His comments were immediately criticized; Handler apologized via Twitter and donated $10,000 to We Need Diverse Books, and promised to match donations up to $100,000. In a New York Times op-ed published shortly thereafter, "The Pain of the Watermelon Joke", Jacqueline Woodson explained that "in making light of that deep and troubled history" with his joke, Daniel Handler had come from a place of ignorance, but underscored the need for her mission to "give people a sense of this country's brilliant and brutal history, so no one ever thinks they can walk onto a stage one evening and laugh at another's too often painful past".

On January 7, 2016, Australian cartoonist Chris Roy Taylor published a cartoon of Jamaican cricketer Chris Gayle with a whole watermelon in his mouth. Gayle had been in the news for making controversial suggestive comments towards a female interviewer during a live broadcast. The cartoon depicted a Cricket Australia official asking a boy if he could "borrow" the watermelon, so Gayle would be unable to speak. A couple of days earlier, a video of a boy eating a whole watermelon – rind and all – in the stands of a cricket match had gone viral. Taylor said he was unaware of the stereotype, and the cartoon was removed.

In "Safety Training", an episode of the American television series The Office, Michael Scott (Steve Carell) throws a watermelon off the roof of the office onto a trampoline. After it bounces and hits a car, Michael fears that the car belongs to Stanley Hudson (Leslie David Baker), who is African-American, and that Stanley will think he is racist; Michael tells Dwight Schrute (Rainn Wilson), "Deactivate the car alarm, clean up the mess, find out whose car that is. If it's Stanley's, call the offices of James P. Albini. See if he handles hate crimes."

On October 22, 2017, the Fox & Friends morning show on the Fox News Channel dressed a Hispanic boy, who was mistaken by many as an African-American, in a watermelon Halloween costume, drawing ire on social media.

In 2019, the video game Crash Team Racing: Nitro Fueled featured an alternative skin for the character of Tawna, named "Watermelon Tawna". The skin has darker fur and darker hair and wears a watermelon-themed T-shirt. Shortly after the skin was introduced, and after some social media discussion of the issue, a patch was issued that renamed the skin "Summertime Tawna".

Also in 2019, British prime minister Boris Johnson alluded to “piccaninies” with “watermelon smiles”, a comment widely criticised as racist and out of touch.

In 2021, the television comedy series Curb Your Enthusiasm season 11 episode "The Watermelon" features Larry David (Larry David) helping his friend Leon Black (J. B. Smoove) to overcome his embarrassment of eating watermelon. Larry takes Leon shopping to purchase a watermelon. At the checkout Larry announces to the store: "It's not a crime for a black man to like watermelon".

Gallery

See also

 Stereotypes of African Americans
 Fried chicken stereotype
 Coon Chicken Inn
 Coon card

Further reading 

 Pilgrim, David. Watermelons, Nooses, and Straight Razors: Stories from the Jim Crow Museum. PM Press. Oct 9, 2017.
Black, William R. How Watermelons Became Black. Journal of the Civil War Era Vol. 8, No. 1, pp. 64–86 (23 pages). University of North Carolina Press. March 2018.
Popular and Pervasive Stereotypes of African Americans. . Oct. 23, 2018.
 How Watermelon's Reputation Got Tangled In Racism. University of Maryland. Aug 2, 2019
 Greenlee, Cynthia. On eating watermelon in front of white people: "I’m not as free as I thought". VOX. Aug 29, 2019.
 Sousa, Emily  and Manish Raizada. Contributions of African Crops to American Culture and Beyond: The Slave Trade and Other Journeys of Resilient Peoples and Crops. Frontiers in Sustainable Food Systems. July 23, 2020.
 Maynard, David and Donald. The Cambridge World History of Food - Cucumbers, Melons, and Watermelons. Cambridge University Press. 2000.

References

External links

Stereotypes of African Americans
Watermelons
Soul food